Robert Ritter may refer to:

 Robert Ritter (1901–1951), a Nazi German psychiatrist who pursued forced sterilization of "Gypsies" (Roma, Sini, and Yenish)
 Robert M. Ritter, British linguist, editor of 2002–2012 editions of Oxford University Press's English style manual New Hart's Rules and usage guide Oxford Dictionary for Writers and Editors (under various titles)
 Robert (Bob) Ritter, fictional CIA Deputy Director of Operations in the Tom Clancy novel Clear and Present Danger (1989)
 The same character, played by Henry Czerny, in the 1994 film adaptation of the novel and Jamie Bell in the 2021 Without Remorse film of Clancy's novel of the same name.

See also 
 Robert Ritter von Greim (1892–1945), Luftwaffe Field Marshal in Nazi Germany, after Hermann Göring